Andrew Masai (born 13 December 1960) is a Kenyan former long-distance runner who competed in road running and cross country running events. He was one of Kenya's best cross country runners in the late 1980s, taking six team gold medals at the IAAF World Cross Country Championships. His best individual finish at that competition was sixth in 1987. He was key to the rise of Kenya in cross country, helping the nation to its first team title and scoring points which helped establish an unbeaten streak in the team race which lasted from 1986 to 2003.

He was also a silver medallist at the African Cross Country Championships in 1985. He was a one-time national champion, taking the long-course Kenyan title in 1991.

A member of the Sabaot tribe, Masai grew up in Chepkoya – a village on Mount Elgon in Kenya's Bungoma County. Over his career spanning twenty years, from 1984 to 2004, he ran mainly cross country until 1991 before switching to road running. He contested mainly races in France and Italy (under Gianni DeMadonna's management) before turning to the United States professional circuit in 2000. He was the national runner-up in cross country three times  (1985, 1987, 1989). Among his road victories were the Giro al Sas (twice), Roma-Ostia Half Marathon (twice), Lyon Half Marathon (twice), the Paris Half Marathon and Indianapolis Half Marathon. He had one win over the marathon distance at the Südtirol Marathon in 1995.

He ran twice at the New York City Marathon (1991 and 1993) and at the Boston Marathon in 1992, but did not place highly. His half marathon best of 60:42 was achieved at the Stramilano race in 1993, where he was runner-up, where his marathon best of 2:11:01 hours was achieved in third place at the 1994 Paris Marathon. His sixth-place finish at the 1994 IAAF World Half Marathon Championships brought him a team gold alongside compatriots Godfrey Kiprotich and Shem Kororia. Towards the end of his career he took part in masters category races after being encouraged to do so by Shawn and Eddy Hellebuyck.

Masai had three children with his wife and with his race winnings set up a transport company and a farming business near Eldoret.

International competitions

National titles
Kenyan Cross Country Championships
Long course: 1991

Circuit wins
Südtirol Marathon: 1995
Roma-Ostia Half Marathon: 1992, 1993
Lyon Half Marathon: 1994, 1995
Paris Half Marathon: 1996
Indianapolis Half Marathon: 1996
Diecimiglia del Garda: 1991
Amatrice-Configno: 1994
Giro al Sas: 1986, 1995

Personal bests
5000 metres – 13:45.90 min (1991)
10,000 metres – 28:23.97 min (1991)
10K run – 27:43 min (1995)
Half marathon – 60:42 min (1993)
Marathon – 2:11:01	(1994)
Info from All-Athletics

References

External links

Living people
1960 births
People from Bungoma County
Kenyan male long-distance runners
Kenyan male marathon runners
Kenyan male cross country runners